The Japanese grass vole (Microtus montebelli) is a species of rodent in the family Cricetidae.
It is found only in Japan.

References

 Baillie, J. 1996.  Microtus montebelli.   2006 IUCN Red List of Threatened Species.   Downloaded on 9 July 2007.
Musser, G. G. and M. D. Carleton. 2005. Superfamily Muroidea. pp. 894–1531 in Mammal Species of the World a Taxonomic and Geographic Reference. D. E. Wilson and D. M. Reeder eds. Johns Hopkins University Press, Baltimore.

Microtus
Mammals described in 1872
Endemic mammals of Japan
Taxonomy articles created by Polbot